The Mixed Individual BC3 boccia competition at the 2004 Summer Paralympics was held from 23 to 26 September at the Ano Liosia Olympic Hall.

The event was won by Paul Gauthier, representing .

Results

Preliminaries

Pool L

Pool M

Pool N

Pool O

Competition bracket

References

X